NCAA Basketball, known in Europe as World League Basketball, is a basketball video game which was developed by Sculptured Software for the Super NES.

It was the first basketball game for a console to utilize a 3D perspective. The game uses the Super Nintendo's Mode 7 to create a 3D players' perspective that became the standard for later basketball video games. Sculptured's NHL Stanley Cup featured a similar effect.

According to short-lived Flux magazine, which originated in the United States, this video game was declared to be the 75th best video game of all time.

Gameplay
In the game, the player chooses a basketball team and then plays against either a computer or human player on a court. The goal is to score the most baskets within the given time through dribbling and passing. Players also have the ability to save the game as well as change options and difficulty settings.

The game allows the player to play either an exhibition game or a full season.

The North American version of the game contains college teams from five major NCAA Division I-A conferences (ACC, Big East, Big 8, SEC, and SWC) but with fictional players, while the European game features fictional professional teams located throughout the world, and the Japanese release has its own fictionalized likenesses of NBA teams.

Reception 

Entertainment Weekly wrote that "While most video basketball games play like most other video basketball games, this Nintendo effort sets itself apart with a unique,rotating 3-D perspective." Nintendo Power ranked NCAA Basketball the ninth best SNES game of 1992.

Notes

References

External links
Info on HAL Laboratory's website

1992 video games
College basketball video games in the United States
HAL Laboratory games
Multiplayer and single-player video games
NCAA video games
Nintendo games
Super Nintendo Entertainment System games
Super Nintendo Entertainment System-only games
Video games developed in the United States